Shepherd's hook may refer to:

A form of crochet hook used to produce slip-stitch crochet fabric
Shepherd's crook, an implement used by shepherds
Earwire, a bow of wire looped to fasten an earring to a pierced ear